also Wakasu Island, is an island located in Koto, Tokyo. It is located south of Shin-Kiba and is connected to a new unnamed island to the south by the Tokyo Gate Bridge.

The place was known connected with the murder of Junko Furuta, a high school student whose body was found there dumped in barrel and completely concreted after four teenage boys, led by Hiroshi Miyano, killing her at their house in Ayase, Adachi.

Details
Wakasu, like many other areas of Tokyo, is reclaimed land. Save for the camping ground, Wakasu was constructed on a base of incinerator bottom ash remains from garbage, a form of land reclamation common in Japan.

Roughly half of the island is an industrial zone, while the other half contains the Wakasu Seaside Park, Wakasu Golf Course, and a popular camping ground. There is also a large wind turbine located nearby the golf course. The 18-hole golf course and the campground attract many people from all over Tokyo.

Wakasu was planned to be the venue for sailing events at the 2020 Summer Olympics, but  it is planned that the yachting will take place in Enoshima, Kanagawa Prefecture. Instead it will host golf moved from Kasumigaseki, Saitama as the planned venue.

Wakasu is the location near where the body of Junko Furuta, the victim of the "1989 concrete-encased high school girl murder case", was discovered after her murder.

Schools
Koto Ward Board of Education operates public elementary and junior high schools.

Minamisuna Elementary School (南砂小学校) is the zoned public elementary school for Wakasu.

Minamisuna Junior High School (南砂中学校) is the zoned public junior high school for Wakasu.

References

External links

 Website of Wakasu Seaside Park
 Some information about the golf course at WorldGolf.com
 Reference and directions to the golf course in Continental Magazine Online.
 Review of the golf course in Golf in Japan.

Artificial islands of Tokyo
Districts of Kōtō
Islands of Tokyo